Elections to Gosport Borough Council took place on 6 May 2021 as part of the 2021 United Kingdom local elections. These took place at the same time as the elections for Hampshire County Council and the Hampshire Police and Crime Commissioner.

Background 
The previous election, held in 2018, saw the Liberal Democrats gain four seats: two from Conservatives, and one each from the Labour and UKIP. This reduced the Conservative Majority to one, remaining in control of the council, whilst UKIP lost their sole seat, in the Rowner and Holbrook ward.

The Statement of Persons Nominated was published on 9 April 2021.

Results summary

Candidates

Alverstoke

Anglesey

Bridgemary North

Bridgemary South

Brockhurst

Christchurch

Elson

Forton

Grange

Hardway

Lee East

Lee West

Leesland

Peel Common

Privett

Rowner and Holbrook

Town

References 

Gosport
2020s in Hampshire
2021